Bob R. Agee was the thirteenth President of Oklahoma Baptist University from 1982 to 1998. He also served as the Executive Director for the International Association of Baptist Colleges and Universities from 1997 to 2007.

Biography
Agee attended Union University in Jackson, Tennessee where he received his Bachelor of Arts degree. He went on to attend the Southern Baptist Theological Seminary in Louisville, Kentucky where he received Master of Divinity and Doctor of Ministry degrees. Agee also holds a Ph.D. in Higher Education Administration from Vanderbilt University's George Peabody College for Teachers in Nashville, Tennessee and an Honorary Doctor of Divinity degree from California Baptist University.

He served as Vice President for Religious Affairs, professor of practical studies in the religion department, and as Special Assistant to the President for Institutional Planning at Union University in Jackson, Tennessee. He then served as the thirteenth President of Oklahoma Baptist University from 1982 to 1998. He was the Executive Director for the International Association of Baptist Colleges and Universities from 1997 to 2007.

He serves on the Boards of Directors of the Council for Christian Colleges and Universities and the National Association of Independent Colleges and Universities. He is also involved with the commission on Policy Analysis for the National Association of Independent Colleges and Universities, the Education and Evangelism Committee of the Baptist World Alliance, the Accreditation Review Council for the North Central Association of Colleges and Secondary Schools, the National Council for the Accreditation of Teacher Education, the National Association of Independent Colleges and Universities, and the Education Commission of the Southern Baptist Convention. From 1998 to 2002, he served as Executive Director of the Consortium for Global Education.

Bibliography
Faithful Learning and the Christian Scholarly Vocation (co-editor)

References

Year of birth missing (living people)
Southern Baptist Theological Seminary alumni
Union University alumni
Vanderbilt University alumni
Christian writers
Presidents of Oklahoma Baptist University
Living people